The Logistic Regiment "Pinerolo" is a military logistics regiment of the Italian Army based in Bari in Apulia. Today the regiment is the logistic unit of the Mechanized Brigade "Pinerolo".

History 
On 13 July 1987 the 10th Transport Battalion "Appia" was formed in Naples. Like all Italian Army transport units the battalion was for a Roman road near its base, in case of the 10th Transport Battalion the Via Appia was chosen. The battalion received the flag and traditions of the 10th Transport Regiment, which had been formed on 1 July 1942 in Naples and been disbanded in 1945 after World War II.

On 1 July 1996 the battalion was reorganized as 10th Military Region Logistic Regiment "Appia", which already on 1 July 1998 was reorganized as 10th Logistic Support Regiment "Appia". On 1 October 1998 the regiment moved to Bari.

On 1 February 2001 the regiment received the Logistic Battalion "Pinerolo" from the Armored Brigade "Pinerolo" and on the same day the regiment was assigned to the Logistic Projection Brigade. On 1 March 2001 the regiment was reorganized as 10th Transport Regiment. At the time the regiment consisted of a regimental command, a command and logistic support company, a transport battalion, and a movement control battalion.

On 12 September 2013 the Logistic Projection Command was disbanded and the 10th Transport Regiment was assigned to the Mechanized Brigade "Pinerolo". In 1 January 2015 the regiment was renamed Logistic Regiment "Pinerolo" and reorganized as a brigade supporting logistic regiment.

Current structure 
Like all Italian Army brigade logistic units the Logistic Regiment "Pinerolo" consists of:

  Regimental Command, in Bari
 Logistic Battalion
 Command
 Tactical Control Squad
 Supply Company
 Transport Company
 Maintenance Company
 Command and Logistic Support Company
 C3 Platoon
 Transport and Materiel Platoon
 Deployment Support Platoon
 Commissariat Platoon
 Garrison Support Unit

The Regimental Command consists of the Commandant's and Personnel Office, the Operations, Training and Information Office, the Logistic Office, and the Administration Office.

See also 
 Military logistics

External links
Italian Army Website: Reggimento Logistico "Pinerolo"

References 

Logistic Regiments of Italy